Martha Henderson (born 24 April 1968) is a Canadian sailor. She competed in the Yngling event at the 2008 Summer Olympics.

References

External links
 

1968 births
Living people
Canadian female sailors (sport)
Olympic sailors of Canada
Sailors at the 2008 Summer Olympics – Yngling
Sportspeople from Toronto